Phnonpenh MODEL is an electronica band created by Hikaru Kotobuki, a former member of P-Model as somewhat of a joke in order to enter a P-Model cover band contest at a club. They continue to regroup from time to time and have released three studio albums and a live CD from their shows in Paris, Berlin and Tokyo. Key members are Hikaru Kotobuki, Lion Merry (ex-Yapoos and Metrofarce) and Masaaki Taniguchi.

Discography
Errors of P-MANIA! (1993, HIRASAWA BYPASS, various artists release)
Desk Top Hard Lock (1994, DIW/SYUN, as "Kotobuki Hikaru with Phnonpenh MODEL")
PATCHWORKS (1998, Club Lunatica/Captain Trip Records)
THE LAST FAMOUS INTERNATIONAL GLUTTONS (1998, Snowdonia, various artists release)
melting high/berlin～paris～tokyo (1999, Club Lunatica)
 (2000, Club Lunatica)
General Midge (2007, IRQ, inc.)

Electronica music groups